Smith's Hill High School, also known as Smiths Hill High School, is a government-funded co-educational academically selective secondary day school, located in Wollongong, in the Illawarra region of New South Wales, Australia.

Established in 1916, the school enrolled approximately 730 students in 2018, from Year 7 to Year 12, of whom 32 percent were from a language background other than English. The school is operated by the NSW Department of Education; the principal is David Deitz.

Overview

Established in 1916, the school is situated in central Wollongong and caters for students from Year 7 to Year 12. Its close proximity to the beach, Wollongong CBD, the University of Wollongong, the Illawarra Institute of Technology, Wollongong Entertainment Centre, Illawarra Performing Arts Centre and Beaton Park sporting complex allows it to provide a balanced curriculum in terms of academic pursuits, cultural and sporting experiences. The curriculum is supplemented by relevant excursions and extra-curricular activities which include camps and national competitions of an academic nature. Students are expected to participate in sport and are encouraged to pursue their strengths in all fields of endeavour. All students are encouraged to become independent learners; make choices concerning their own learning paths; and to extend themselves through involvement in extra-curricular activities.

The application and testing process for students seeking enrolment into Year 7 at Selective Schools in NSW is centrally administered by the High Performing Students Unit of the New South Wales Department of Education. Applications for Year 7 are made in Year 5 with testing undertaken in Year 6. Applications open in mid-October and close in mid-November. Application Forms are available from local primary schools or can be downloaded from the High Performing Students Unit website when applications open. Students seeking a place at the school after Semester 1 in Year 7 make an application directly to the school. Each selective school administers its own application and selection processes for Years 8 – 12. Application packages are available from late June and need to be submitted by late July. Further information and application forms are also available from the High Performing Students Unit website.

History
In 1906, Wollongong Primary School began to offered vocational education courses for non-academic students. This included courses such as Household Accounts, Cookery, Laundry and Dressmaking. Five years later, in 1911, secondary courses were offered to academic students which allowed students to achieve the Intermediate Certificate and with further study, the Leaving Certificate.

A separate school for these courses was then established in 1916 under the name Wollongong Home Science School. This school was a single-sex education school for girls only and was based on a site in Smith Street, Wollongong. In 1957, the school relocated to its current location on the former site of Wollongong High School in Gipps Street and then in 1958, was renamed as Smith's Hill Girls High School. The school then allowed non-academic students to achieve the Intermediate and Leaving Certificates.

During the 1970s, plans were underway to change the school into a comprehensive, co-educational High School and in 1979 the school was renamed Smith's Hill High School. In 1985, boys were enrolled in Years 7, 8, 9 and 11 drawing from feeder schools at Wollongong, Coniston and Mount St Thomas. By 1986, SHHS was completely co-educational from Years 7 through 12.

Then in 1988, the NSW Department of Education decided to make the school a selective high school and from 1989 the annual Year 7 intake of students was to be filled through exam selections. The school has remained completely selective ever since.

Higher School Certificate
Students of Smith's Hill High School have consistently performed well in the NSW Higher School Certificate examinations, with the school placing 38th in the state in 2010 and having fifteen students make the All-round Achievers List. As a result of strong HSC performances, a high percentage of students from Smith's Hill High gain university entrance each year. This tradition of success has been in the school for many years.

Smith's Hill offers a diverse range of subjects for both seniors and juniors in a number of key learning areas. For senior subjects which are unable to be offered due to lack of numbers, students are assisted to complete these subjects through distance education, in association with an appropriate distance education school.

Extracurricular activities

Rock Eisteddfod Challenge 
For many years, Smith's Hill High School participated in the Rock Eisteddfod Challenge. The school was in the Grand Final every year from 2004 and was a regular Grand Final contender in years previous. Due to the preparation time required, and the high level of physical activity involved, the Rock Eisteddfod Challenge performance was worked on during weekly sport activities. Smith's Hill High School participated in two divisions of Rock Eisteddfod Challenge, the RAW Division for Years 8 through 10, and the Premier Division for Years 11 and 12. Unlike other schools, students were not required to audition and positions are filled with preference given to students based on their grade. Also, Smith's Hill was one of the few schools that offered Year 7 students an opportunity to compete, with the most recent Year 7 RAW production being 'Nelson Mandela: Son of Africa' in 2011, which came fifth in the state finals in Sydney. There were a number of teachers involved at Smith's Hill who were also part of the Rock Eisteddfod Challenge.

In 2006, the Premier Division team performed "Tibet: Roof of the World". The storyline included "Tibetan monks paying their last respects to the previous Dalai Lama, as well as the 1949 Chinese invasion and the exile of His Holiness the 14th Dalai Lama." After this performance, the team were granted a private audience with the Dalai Lama who asked the students to "continue to spread his message of peace, spirituality and protection of the environment to others throughout the state."

Tournament of Minds
Smith's Hill regularly submits teams to participate in the Tournament of Minds competition. The school has had several successes in the competition with the 1998 team being state finalists, the 2002 and 2003 teams being national finalists and the 2005, 2018, 2019 x2 teams winning the national final. In 2008, for the first time two teams were entered in the competition which resulted in the Social Sciences team placing second in New South Wales and the Language Literature team gaining second place at the Australasian Finals in Melbourne. In 2010, the Applied Technology team succeeded in becoming national finalists and in 2012 the Maths and Engineering team scored tournament honours in the Australasian Finals in Perth.. In 2013, the Language Literature team again placed second at the Australasian Finals in Canberra. In 2015, a Language literature team also made it to the Australasian Pacific Finals in Sydney and gained tournament honours. In 2017, a Language literature team once again made it to the Australasian Pacific Finals in Adelaide and placed 2nd with tournament honours. In 2018, the Tournament of Minds Language / Literature team won internationals, the biggest win the school had experienced. In 2019 this was surpassed with two teams - Social Sciences and STEM - winning internationals at Hobart after winning the state tournament in 2019.

School productions
Smith's Hill High School has a history in performing school productions such as musicals and plays. In 2001, Smith's Hill High School produced its first musical in recent history, performing Little Shop of Horrors. Since then, school productions have been staged regularly including performances of Oklahoma! and compilations of various other musicals. In 2015, the school staged an outstanding production of Guys and Dolls.

In 2006, the production team of Ribbit Up Productions was formed by drama teacher Bryan Cutler and has since performed at least one original show per year including "The Little Country That Could", "How to Host a Murder", "The Big Box" and "Overbelly". A junior offshoot of the company was formed soon after known as Tadpole Productions which has performed shows such as "Earthwatch", "Noughts and Crosses", "When Books Go Bump in the Night",  "Personal Space", "Escape From RealiTV" and most recently, "Earthwatch 2.0", a remake of the original with a brand new cast. In 2011, the company differed from its annual performance of an original play and instead performed an adaptation of Hamlet. In 2012 they performed "The Magic Mountain", and in 2013 "Macguffin". Returning again to Shakespeare in 2014, "Whatever you Will", a pastiche of Shakespeare's comedies, was performed. More recent names to Cutler's record include; "Beethoven's Summer" performed in 2015, which followed Cutler's personal recollections of his childhood and growing up in Australia, and in 2016, "221a" was performed which honoured the BBC's Sherlock (TV series). In 2017, Cutler returned to political satire in "You Can't Have One Without the Other" followed by an adaption of Shakespeare's Richard III in 2018, which saw widespread acclaim.

Due to the cancellation of Rock Eisteddfod Challenge in 2010, the Smith's Hill music department offered the opportunity to students to participate in a production of the musical The Pajama Game. Performed in July 2010, the production placed second in the Arcadian Theatre Group's School Musical Theatre competition which involved judging of school musicals in the Illawarra.  In 2013, the music department produced another musical, this time performing "Anything Goes". Several years later, in 2015, the school also did a production of the critically acclaimed musical "Guys and Dolls".

Mooting
Since 2008 Smith's Hill High School has entered into the High School Mooting Competition of Bond University to promote and encourage Legal Studies students within the school. The school has achieved much success in the competition achieving second at the National Finals in 2009 and reaching the National Finals in 2011.

Debating
Smiths Hill High School has reached the NSW semi-finals for the Premier's Debating Challenge since 2007, winning the competition on five occasions, most recently in 2019.

The representative NSW Combined High Schools debating team has also included Smith's Hill students over the last several years. In recent years they won the Hume Barbour Trophy.

Ensembles
Smith's Hill also has a variety of music groups and ensembles. Each practice regularly and perform at special events, such as formal assemblies and open days including the School Expo, Presentation Nights and the 50th Birthday Open Day. At the end of the year, participating students get the opportunity to spend two days busking in Sydney. The music ensembles include:

String Ensemble
This ensemble is for students who play violin, viola, double bass and cello, accompanied by a piano player. The ensemble usually plays arrangements of the classical genre, and is instructed by a professional tutor.

Recently many folk, recent and more up-beat popular tunes have been played, such as compositions by Coldplay and Lady Gaga. It is available for anyone in the school who plays one of the instruments at a solid level.

The String Ensemble has played at eisteddfods, weddings and a number of other functions across the Illawarra.

Concert Band
This band is for students who can play brass or woodwind instruments, as well as percussion and instruments in the rhythm section.

Vocal Ensemble
The Vocal Ensemble is for any student who has an interest in singing. Smith's Hill's most accredited musical piece was their rendition of Beyonce's "Halo", performed angelically by an aspiring historian in 2017. Open to all students of sc is willing to participate in practices after school. This ensemble is great fun and all students learn about harmony and create beautiful harmony with each other.

Chorale Group
The Chorale Group is a cappella group and entrance is by invitation only.

Junior Jazz Ensemble
This ensemble is for students in Years 7–10 who have an interest in Jazz and can play an instrument suitable to the Jazz genre.

Jazz Band
Formerly known as the Stage Band, the Senior Jazz Band is a small performance group made up of experienced student musicians, and is designed to play at school events where it would be less practical for the Concert Band to perform.

See also

 List of government schools in New South Wales
 List of selective high schools in New South Wales
 Education in Australia

References

External links
 

Educational institutions established in 1916
Schools in Wollongong
Rock Eisteddfod Challenge participants
Public high schools in New South Wales
Selective schools in New South Wales
1916 establishments in Australia